Danville Regional Airport  is three miles east of Danville, in southern Virginia. The Federal Aviation Administration (FAA) National Plan of Integrated Airport Systems for 2017–2021 categorized it as a regional general aviation facility.

The first airline flights were Eastern DC-3s in 1947; Eastern pulled out in 1964. Piedmont arrived in 1948.

Facilities
It has two asphalt runways: 2/20 is 5,900 by 100 feet (1,798 x 30 m) and 13/31 is 3,910 by 100 feet (1,192 x 30 m).

In the year ending August 31, 2014 the airport had 20,773 aircraft operations, average 57 per day: 99% general aviation and <1% military. In January 2017 38 aircraft were based at the airport: 33 single-engine, 3 multi-engine and 2 jets.

Taxiway revamp
In January 2017 the City Council of Danville approved a 3.1 million dollar project to rebuild taxiway "A" while narrowing it to 35 feet. Construction work was scheduled to begin in March 2017.

References

External links 
 Danville Regional Airport at City of Danville website
 Aerial photo as of 1 April 1994 from USGS The National Map
 

Airports in Virginia
Transportation in Pittsylvania County, Virginia
Transportation in Danville, Virginia
Buildings and structures in Pittsylvania County, Virginia